Pigskin is a 1979 video game by Acorn Software Products for the TRS-80 Model I Level II.

Plot summary
Pigskin is a football game with ten offensive plays and six defensive plays, and a player can either play against the computer opponent or another human opponent. In single-player mode there are five levels of difficulty.

Reception
J. Mishcon reviewed Pigskin in The Space Gamer No. 30. Mishcon commented that "A super game for kids who will love plenty of scoring but probably not the answer for a real lover of football."

References

1979 video games
TRS-80 games
TRS-80-only games
American football video games
Video games developed in the United States